Manlio Di Stefano (born 16 May 1981) is an Italian MP from the Five Star Movement.

Political career 
He has been the Undersecretary of State for Foreign Affairs and International Cooperation in the Conte I government and the Conte II government.

References 

Living people
1981 births
Deputies of Legislature XVII of Italy
Deputies of Legislature XVIII of Italy
Five Star Movement politicians